Pope Pius VII (r. 1800–1823) created 99 cardinals in 19 consistories.

August 11, 1800

 Diego Innico Caracciolo
 Ercole Consalvi

October 20, 1800

 Luis María de Borbón y Vallabriga

February 23, 1801

 Giuseppe Firrao
 Ferdinando Maria Saluzzo
 Luigi Ruffo-Scilla
 Bartolomeo Pacca
 Cesare Brancadoro
 Giovanni Filippo Gallarati Scotti
 Filippo Casoni
 Girolamo della Porta
 Giulio Gabrielli
 Francesco Mantica
 Valentino Mastrozzi
 Giuseppe Albani
 Marino Carafa di Belvedere
 Antonio Felice Zondadari
 Lorenzo Litta
 Michelangelo Luchi
 Carlo Crivelli
 Giuseppe Spina
 Michele di Pietro
 Carlo Francesco Caselli
 Alphonse-Hubert de Latier de Bayane
 Francesco Maria Locatelli
 Giovanni Castiglione
 Charles Erskine

August 9, 1802

 Domenico Pignatelli di Belmonte

January 17, 1803

 Jean de Dieu-Raymond de Cucé de Boisgelin
 Anton Theodor Colloredo-Waldsee-Mels
 Pietro Antonio Zorzi
 Diego Gregorio Cadello
 Jean-Baptiste de Belloy
 Étienne Hubert de Cambacérès
 Joseph Fesch

May 16, 1803

 Miguel Carlos José de Noronha
 Luigi Gazzoli

July 11, 1803

 Antonio Despuig y Dameto
 Pietro Francesco Galleffi

March 26, 1804

 Carlo Oppizzoni

August 24, 1807

 Francesco Guidobono Cavalchini

March 8, 1816

 Annibale della Genga - Elected as Pope Leo XII (1823-1829)
 Pietro Gravina
 Domenico Spinucci
 Lorenzo Caleppi
 Antonio Gabriele Severoli
 Giuseppe Morozzo della Rocca
 Tommaso Arezzo
 Francesco Saverio Castiglioni - Elected as Pope Pius VIII (1829-1830)
 Carlo Andrea Pelagallo
 Benedetto Naro
 Francisco Antonio Javier de Gardoqui Arriquíbar
 Dionisio Bardaxí y Azara
 Antonio Lamberto Rusconi
 Emmanuele de Gregorio
 Giovanni Battista Zauli
 Nicola Riganti
 Alessandro Malvasia
 Francesco Fontana
 Giovanni Caccia-Piatti
 Alessandro Lante
 Pietro Vidoni, iuniore
 Camillo de Simone
 Giovanni Battista Quarantotti
 Giorgio Doria Pamphilj
 Luigi Ercolani
 Stanislao Sanseverino
 Pedro de Quevedo y Quintano
 Francesco Cesarei Leoni
 Antonio Lante
 Lorenzo Prospero Bottini
 Fabrizio Sceberras Testaferrata

September 23, 1816

 Francisco Antonio Cebrián y Valdá
 Maria-Thaddäus von Trauttmansdorf Weinsberg
 Franziskus Xaver von Salm-Reifferscheidt
 Paolo Giuseppe Solaro di Villanova

July 28, 1817

 Alexandre Angélique de Talleyrand-Périgord
 César Guillaume de La Luzerne
 Louis-François de Bausset-Roquefort

October 1, 1817

 Agostino Rivarola

April 6, 1818

 Johann Casimir von Häffelin

June 4, 1819  

 Archduke Rudolf of Austria

September 27, 1819

 Carlos da Cunha e Menezes
 Cesare Guerrieri Gonzaga

December 2, 1822

 Anne-Antoine-Jules de Clermont-Tonnerre

March 10, 1823

 Francesco Bertazzoli
 Gianfrancesco Falzacappa
 Antonio Pallotta
 Francesco Serlupi
 Carlo Maria Pedicini
 Luigi Pandolfi
 Fabrizio Turriozzi
 Ercole Dandini
 Carlo Odescalchi
 Antonio Maria Frosini
 Tommaso Riario Sforza
 Viviano Orfini
 Placido Zurla

May 16, 1823

 Anne Louis Henri de La Fare

References

Pius 7
19th-century Catholicism
Pope Pius VII
College of Cardinals